The Republic of Texas presidential election of 1841 was the third presidential election.  It was held on September 6, 1841.  Former President Sam Houston defeated incumbent Vice President and former Interim President David G. Burnet to win a second non-consecutive term in office.

Edward Burleson was elected vice-president with 6,141 votes (58.6%) while his competitor Mennican Hunt received 4,336 votes (41.4%).

References

1841 elections in North America
presidential election, 1841
Non-partisan elections
1841